Xenomigia brachyptera is a moth of the family Notodontidae. It is found in the Andes of western Venezuela.

References

Moths described in 2000
Notodontidae of South America